Max Weiler (born 27 August 1910 in Absam, Austria; died 29 January 2001 in Vienna) was an Austrian painter.

Honours and awards
 Grand Austrian State Prize for Fine Arts (1960)
 Medal of Tyrol (1970)
 Austrian Decoration for Science and Art (1979)
 Ring of Honour of Hall in Tirol (1987)
 Tyrolean State Prize for Art (1987)
 Honorary Medal of the Austrian capital Vienna in Gold (1987)
 Grand Silver Medal with Star for Services to the Republic of Austria (1995)
 Honorary citizen of Vienna (2000)
 Grand Gold Medal with Star for Services to the Republic of Austria (2000)

References

1910 births
2001 deaths
People from Innsbruck-Land District
20th-century Austrian painters
Austrian male painters
Recipients of the Grand Decoration with Star for Services to the Republic of Austria
Recipients of the Austrian Decoration for Science and Art
Recipients of the Grand Austrian State Prize
20th-century Austrian male artists

de:Max Weiler